"Bones" is a song by British soul musician Michael Kiwanuka, from his debut studio album Home Again. It was released as the fourth single from the album in the United Kingdom via digital download on 24 September 2012. The song was written by Michael Kiwanuka & Jamie Scott and produced by Paul Butler.

Background
On 9 August 2012 Michael announced that "Bones" would be released as the fourth single from his debut album Home Again in the United Kingdom on 24 September 2012.

Track listing

Credits and personnel
 Lead vocals – Michael Kiwanuka
 Producers – Paul Butler
 Lyrics – Michael Kiwanuka
 Label: Polydor Records

Chart performance

Release history

References

2012 singles
Michael Kiwanuka songs
Polydor Records singles
2011 songs
Songs written by Jamie Scott
Songs written by Michael Kiwanuka